Buchanan is a historic parish in Stirlingshire in Scotland.

It includes a large part of the eastern shore of Loch Lomond.  The most populated village in the parish is Milton of Buchanan, but the village that is most popular with tourists is Balmaha.

Settlements
Balmaha
Buchanan Smithy
Cashel Farm
Inversnaid
Milarrochy
Milton of Buchanan
Rowardennan
Rowchoish
Sallochy

Stirlingshire
Civil parishes of Scotland